These are the official results of the Men's 1.500 metres event at the 1995 IAAF World Championships in Gothenburg, Sweden. There were a total number of 44 participating athletes, with four qualifying heats, two semi-finals and the final held on Sunday 1995-08-13.

All eyes were on world record holder Noureddine Morceli, who had just improved upon his world record a month earlier.  What strategy could beat him?  Nobody wanted to try to run fast from the start, Paul McMullen became the early leader and as the largest man in the field, the wind blocker while everybody else was drafting behind.  Morceli stayed out of trouble, near the front of the pack, watching around him.  After 800 metres Vénuste Niyongabo moved to the outside of McMullen and started to edge forward with Morceli the next man back on the outside marking anybody who dared to get too far in front.  With 500 metres to go, Morceli grew impatient and eased into the lead for the bell.  The Morceli started to open up his lead.  Niyongabo was late to react, giving away a few metres as the lap began and never able to gain any ground.  By the home stretch Morceli had more than 15 metres on Niyongabo.  Down the home stretch, a 20 year old Hicham El Guerrouj edged by Niyongabo.  Morceli slowed before the finish line almost walking across with the gold, the relatively unknown El Guerrouj got the silver and Niyongabo held on for bronze.

Final

Semi-finals
Held on Friday 1995-08-11

Qualifying heats
Held on Thursday 1995-08-10

References
 Results
 Results - World Athletics

 
1500 metres at the World Athletics Championships